H3 – Halloween Horror Hostel is a German horror-parody, part of the TV series . The film was directed by Michael Karen and written by Stefan Barth.

Plot 
During a cooking show, Tim Mälzer got repeated phone calls from a mysterious person, who asks for popcorn. After several calls Mälzer responds to the person, that threatened him to kill him, like he did it with the camera man. Mälzer looked for the camera man, but he had disappeared. Then the microwave rings and Mälzer opened it and find the camera man's head inside. After that a Jigsaw puppet appeared driving a small red car and asked again enraged for the popcorn.

In the same time the four friends Nico, Janine, Acki and Martin driving through a forest.

Cast 
Alfonso Losa as Nico
Jennifer Ulrich as Janin
Axel Stein as Acki
Hendrik von Bültzingslöwen as Martin
Christian Tramitz as Harry
Mike Krüger as Michael Meier
Ivonne Schönherr as Ficky
Anni Wendler as Paris
Mirjam Weichselbraun as Sidney
Holger C. Gotha as Vater von Sidney
Santiago Ziesmer as Jigsaw (voice)

Parodies 
The movie contains many references and parodies of many known horror-thriller movies:
Halloween - The main theme can be heard, when the four friends walking through the forest.
Friday the 13th
Hostel
Dead End
Saw - The Jigsaw puppet.
The Ring
Ju-on
I Know What You Did Last Summer
Scream
28 Weeks Later
House of Wax -  Letter animation at the beginning
The Evil Dead - Camera drives
Dawn of the Dead
The Texas Chainsaw Massacre
Freddy vs. Jason
From Dusk till Dawn
Donnie Darko - The smoking lookalike Donnie Darko rabbit scene
E.T. the Extra-Terrestrial - Jigsaw puppet flies with his red car in front of shining moon.
Harry Potter
Michael Jackson's Thriller - The dance routine of the zombies, with the music

References

External links
 

2008 films
2008 television films
2008 television episodes
German television films
2000s German-language films
German-language television shows
2000s parody films
2008 horror films
2000s comedy horror films
Parody television episodes
ProSieben original programming
Parodies of horror
Parodies of films
2008 comedy films